Frank Wright, sometimes but not always an abbreviation of Francis Wright, may refer to:

Entertainment
 Frank Wright (jazz musician) (1935–1990), free jazz saxophonist
 Frank Wright (painter) (born 1932), American painter
 Frank Wright Jr. (1912–2008), American commercial artist
 Tré Cool or Frank Edwin Wright III (born 1972), drummer of Green Day

Sports
 Frank Wright (cricketer, born 1807) (1807–1891), English cricketer
 Frank Wright (cricketer, born 1844) (1844–1924), English cricketer
 Frank Wright (cricketer, born 1870) (1870–1943), English cricketer
 Frank Wright (sport shooter) (1878–1931), American sport shooter
 Frank Wright (footballer) (1898–?), English footballer
 Frank I. Wright (1921–1992), American Thoroughbred horse racing trainer and television commentator

Other
 Frank Lloyd Wright (1867–1959), American architect
 Frank Wright (historian) (1938–2003), in Las Vegas
 Frank Wright, co-founder of A&W Restaurants

See also
 Francis Wright (disambiguation)
 Frances Wright (disambiguation)